Yolanda Ventura (born October 21, 1968 in Barcelona, Spain) is a dual nationality Spanish/Mexican actress and was a Spanish singer when she was young . She is best known for roles in Mexican telenovelas and is a former member of the Spanish children's music band Parchís.  She joined Parchís after a recording company posted an advertisement looking for kids who could sing, dance, and act. A few months later, in 1979, the band was formed and named after the Spanish version of the Pachisi board game. The band was a success in Spain and Latin America, they recorded five albums and filmed seven movies (three in Argentina).

In the mid-1980s, the band split. Yolanda moved to Mexico in the early 1990s obtaining the role of Astrid in Lucía Méndez's telenovela Amor de nadie. She then joined the cast of Muchachitas. She then played a prostitute in the Corazón salvaje.

Theater
 Monólogos de la vagina, Spanish version of The Vagina Monologues

TV shows
 Como dice el dicho (2011–2013)
 La Rosa de Guadalupe (2008-)
 Desafio (1990)
 Platos rotos (1985) as Mariel

Telenovelas
S.O.S me estoy enamorando (2021-2022) Elsa
Fuego ardiente (2021) as Pilar
"Mujeres de negro" (2016) as Giovanna
"La sombra del pasado" (2014-2015) as Irma
"Amor Bravío" (2012) as Piedad
 "La que no podia amar" (2011) as Gloria
 Cuando me enamoro (2010) as Karina Aguilar
 En Nombre del Amor (2008) as Angelica
 Yo amo a Juan Querendon (2007) as Laura
 Contra viento y marea (2005) as Isabel
 Piel de otoño (2004) as Mayte
 Amy, la niña de la mochila azul (2004) as Angelica Hinojosa #2
 Bajo la misma piel (2003) as Macarena
 ¡Vivan los niños! (2002) as Dolores Herrera
 Atrévete a olvidarme (2001) as Liliana
 Carita de ángel (2000) as Julieta
 El diario de Daniela (1999) as Natalia Navarro Monroy
 La paloma (1995)
 Corazón salvaje (1993) as Azucena
 Muchachitas (1991) as Gloria
 Amor de nadie (1990) as Astrid

Films

 Dos gallos de oro (2002)
 De qué se ríen las mujeres (1997) Movie as Abuela
 La noche de la ira (1985) Movie

With Parchís
 La Gran aventura de Los Parchís (1983)
 Parchís entra en acción (1983)
 Las locuras de Parchís (1982)
 La magia de Los Parchís (1982)
 La segunda guerra de los niños (1981)
 Los parchís contra el hombre invisible (1981)
 Guerra de los niños (1980)

External links
Yolanda Ventura at the Telenovela database

Yolanda Ventura  at the Parchís website
Parchís  fan website.
History  of Parchís.

1968 births
Living people
Actresses from Barcelona
Spanish actresses
Mexican actresses
Spanish expatriates in Mexico
Spanish women singers
Singers from Barcelona
Mexican people of Catalan descent
Spanish child singers